Ray Willsey (September 30, 1928 – November 4, 2013) was an American gridiron football player and coach.  He was the head football coach at the University of California, Berkeley from 1964 to 1971. During his tenure he compiled a 40–42–1 record. He was inducted into the Orange County Sports Hall of Fame in 1993.

Early life and playing career
Willsey was born in Regina, Saskatchewan, and played defensive back and quarterback at Tustin High School and Santa Ana College. He played for the California Golden Bears, helping the Bears win 26–0 against Stanford in 1952. He graduated from the University of California in 1953 with a degree in business. During 1953, Willsey toured Australia and New Zealand  playing rugby league for the American All Stars. When the team landed in Australia, they did not know what the sport was. One week later, they played against the best players in the world in front of 65,453 people at the Sydney Cricket Ground. He then played for three years for the Edmonton Eskimos in Canada, but his playing career was ended by an elbow injury. He was a member of the Edmonton teams that won the 42nd Grey Cup and 43rd Grey Cup.

Coaching career 
Willsey's first assistant coaching job was at the age of 28 with the Washington Huskies under head coach Darrell Royal. He followed Royal to the University of Texas in 1957. His first NFL position was at defensive coordinator with the Saint Louis Cardinals in 1961, where he went 2–0 as co-head coach. Willsey coached the California Golden Bears from 1964 to 1971.  His 1968 team finished 7–3–1, recording three shutout victories and holding eight of 12 opponents to 12 points or less, earning its defensive unit the nickname "The Bear Minimum."  In 1971, Willsey resigned from Cal, and in 1973, he rejoined the Cardinals as defensive coordinator under head coach Don Coryell. He moved to the Oakland Raiders in 1977 as backfield coach. With the Raiders, Willsey coached on Super Bowl-winning teams in 1980 (Super Bowl XV) and 1983 (Super Bowl XVIII).

In 1988, Willsey served as head coach of the Los Angeles Cobras during that team's only year of existence in the Arena Football League, in which his team compiled a 5–6–1 record. He was defensive coach of the London Monarchs when they won the World League title in 1991, and he became their head coach for the 1992 season. He was defensive coordinator for the Scottish Claymores in the mid-90s, and became director of personnel for NFL Europe in 1996. He was awarded the Glenn T. Seaborg Award in 2002, an annual honor given by Cal's football alumni association to a former Cal football player for his career accomplishments.

Death
Willsey died on November 4, 2013 at the age of 85.

Head coaching record

College

Professional

References

1928 births
2013 deaths
Canadian football defensive backs
Canadian players of American football
California Golden Bears athletic directors
California Golden Bears football coaches
Edmonton Elks players
Frankfurt Galaxy coaches
London Monarchs coaches
Players of Canadian football from Saskatchewan
Santa Ana Dons football players
Scottish Claymores coaches
Texas Longhorns football coaches
Washington Huskies football coaches
Washington Commandos coaches
Sportspeople from Regina, Saskatchewan
St. Louis Cardinals (football) head coaches